The 4 Street SW station is a CTrain light rail station in downtown Calgary, Alberta, Canada. The 4 Street SW platform is served by westbound trains only, with the nearest eastbound platforms being the 3 Street SW station and the 6 Street SW station. The platform is located on the north side of 7 Avenue South, within the free-fare zone serving both Routes 201 and 202.

The 4 Street W station, located between 4 Street & 5 Street SW opened on May 25, 1981, as part of Calgary's original LRT line from 8 Street W to Anderson. The original station was closed on January 7, 2010, and demolished immediately with the new station constructed in its place. The new station opened on January 21, 2011.

Like all refurbished 7 Avenue platforms, the entire sidewalk slopes up to the station at both ends and the platform can handle 4-car trains.

The station registered an average of 11,100 daily boardings in 2005.

Crime
During the night hours of January 10th, 2022, a violent fight would take place between two men right outside of the 4th Street LRT Station. This violent fight would be recorded and would end up with one of the men in the fight getting stabbed.

On Wednesday March 15th, 2023 at roughly 6:20 AM, police were called to 4 Street SW Downtown LRT station. A man and a woman were rushed to hospital with stab wounds in non-life-threatening condition. The station was shut down at 7:26 AM for further investigation and a man was taken into custody. This incident would get widely publicized, with people criticizing Calgary Transit and general concern being brought up due to a surplus in crime happening along the C-Train system.

References

CTrain stations
Railway stations in Canada opened in 1981